The 1500 meters distance for men in the 2013–14 ISU Speed Skating World Cup was contested over six races on six occasions, out of a total of six World Cup occasions for the season, with the first occasion taking place in Calgary, Alberta, Canada, on 8–10 November 2013, and the final occasion taking place in Heerenveen, Netherlands, on 14–16 March 2014.

Koen Verweij of the Netherlands won the cup, while Denis Yuskov of Russia came second, and Shani Davis of the United States came third. The defending champion, Zbigniew Bródka of Poland, had to settle for fourth place.

Top three

Race medallists

Standings 
Standings as of 15 March 2014 (end of the season).

References 

 
Men 1500